The Sun Belt Conference Men's Basketball Player of the Year is a basketball award given to the most outstanding men's basketball player in the Sun Belt Conference (SBC). The award was first given following the conference's first basketball season of 1976–77. Four players have been selected twice (Terry Catledge, Chris Gatling, Chico Fletcher, and R. J. Hunter), while no player has earned a three-time player of the year selection.

Western Kentucky, which left the SBC for Conference USA in 2014, has the most all-time winners with seven. Among schools remaining in the SBC beyond 2014, South Alabama, the only charter member that has continuously been in the conference, has the most winners with six.

Key

Winners

Notes

Winners by school

References

NCAA Division I men's basketball conference players of the year
Player of the Year
Awards established in 1977